The elections for the Chandigarh Municipal Corporation were held on 24 December 2021. 203 candidates campaigned for 35 seats in the Chandigarh election. Election results were declared on 27 December 2021.

Contesting the Chandigarh Municipal Corporation elections for the first time, Aam Aadmi Party (AAP) won 14 seats and became the single largest party in the council of total 35 elected seats. 

During the vote for mayor election, Congress and Shiromani Akali Dal did not vote. One Congress Councillor defected and joined BJP and one AAP vote was declared invalid. Bhartiya Janata Party's Sarabjit Kaur was elected as the new mayor of Chandigarh with 14 votes in support and 13 against. AAP have disputed the mayor election and appealed in the Punjab and Haryana High Court to quash the election of mayor, citing irregularities in the process.

Background 
2016 Chandigarh Municipal Corporation election was won by Bharatiya Janata Party (BJP) + Shiromani Akali Dal (SAD) alliance. In the 2019 Indian general election, Chandigarh (Lok Sabha constituency) was won by BJP.

In the 2021 Chandigarh Municipal Corporation election, SAD and BJP contested separately without an alliance. Aam Aadmi Party (AAP) contested this election for the first time.

The number of wards of the corporation were increased from 26 in 2016 to 35 in the 2021 election.

Major issues of the electorate

Tariffs
The BJP-ruled corporation had increased the water tariff by 20,000 per cent. This created a widespread discontent among the residents. AAP promised to "provide free water up to 20,000 litres to each family in Chandigarh every month".

There was an acute shortage of parking space. As the problem aggravated local traffic control, the BJP-led corporation increased the parking charges in the city. The increase in the waste collection charges, water tariff and property tax rates during the last five years turned the voters against the incumbent BJP.

The increased expenditure for the basic amenities and these tariff hikes led to a strong discontent among the voters.

Cleanliness
In 2016, Chandigarh was the second cleanest city of India. In 2016 BJP came to power in the corporation. In the years that followed, garbage from the city was not disposed of properly. Lack of a proper process or mechanism led to the garbage piling up at Dadumajra.

In 2021, Chandigarh fell to the 66th position in the list of cleanest cities of India. The city had always taken pride in the fact that it was one of the cleanest cities of the country. The fall in cleanliness became an important poll issue. The residents were upset by the downfall in the cleanliness.

COVID-19 
The government's handling of the COVID-19 pandemic in India damaged BJP's image as the voters felt that they were not given their desired help in getting the hospital beds and medical oxygen from their elected representatives. The sitting Councillors were found to be unapproachable when the public needed support. No major relief measure was taken by the local government.

Campaign

AAP
The newcomer candidates from AAP focussed on the local issues such as parking, waste management, water supply and education. The candidates reached out to the voters and promised to bring a change if elected.

Star Campaigners 
Avrind Kejriwal
Bhagwant Mann
Harpal Singh Cheema
Pardeep Chabra,
Sanjay Singh

BJP
During the campaign, the BJP candidates were relying on the popularity of the BJP Prime Minister Narendra Modi. The candidates did not focus on the local issues and tried to promote the work done under the Premiership of Narendra Modi.

Chandigarh had fallen from second place to sixty-sixth place in the list of cleanest cities in India, this was a major concern for the residents who voted out the ruling BJP party in the civic election.

Star Campaigners 

Amit Shah
JP Nadda
Anurag Thakur
Pushkar Singh Dhami
Jai Ram Thakur
Yogi Adityanath

Polling Process 
Around 6.3 lakh voters were eligible to cast their votes. The wards were increased from 26 to 35. 694 polling booths were set up across Chandigarh. No VVPAT machines were used in this election. 60% votes were recorded in the election.

The Chandigarh administration declared December 22, 23, 24 and 27 as dry day and prohibited the sale and serving of liquor on these days, during the election and counting. Polls were counted on 27 December. Nine counting centers were set up for 35 wards.

Results 
Contesting the Chandigarh Municipal Corporation elections for the first time, AAP won 14 seats and became the single largest party in the council of total 35 elected seats. Sitting mayor Ravi Kant Sharma from BJP lost his seat to AAP candidate Damanpreet Singh.

In ward number 21, former mayor and BJP candidate Davesh Moudgil was defeated by AAP's Jasbir.

Overall results

Ward Wise Results

Aftermath 
On 30 December 2021, Arvind Kejriwal took part in a road show to express gratitude towards Chandigarh people.

Ravi Kant Sharma was the sitting mayor at the time of election. He lost his seat to Damanpreet Singh, an AAP candidate. Of the five-year term of the MC House, the MCC mayor seat during the first and fourth years is reserved for the women. 2022 being the first year of the term, is reserved for women mayor.

Mayor election 
3 January was the last date for submission of nominations for the post of the mayor, senior deputy mayor and deputy mayor of Chandigarh Municipal Corporation. New office holders for these posts will be elected on 8 January 2022, in the assembly hall of the Chandigarh municipal corporation (CMC). BJP councilor Maheshinder Singh Sidhu will be presiding the mayor election.

A party has to win 19 wards so that its councilor can be elected as the mayor. After the election no party held a clear majority and AAP remains the single largest party with 14 councilors. The contest for Mayor seat was between AAP with 14 seats and BJP with 12 seats. Congress with 8 seats was out of the Mayor race.

On 2 January, ward 10 councilor who won the election on Congress party ticket, joined BJP and increased BJP strength to 13. The Chandigarh MP also has a vote in the house. Kirron Kher is the BJP MP from the Chandigarh seat. Adding these two votes in support of BJP, the BJP's vote tally became 14 (same as AAP). 19 votes are needed to get elected as a Mayor.

To prevent the members from engaging in cross party votes or changing their party, AAP moved its newly elected councilors to Delhi and Congress shifted their councilors to Jaipur. AAP claimed that the Delhi visit of their councilors was planned in advance.

Voting
Congress and SAD abstained from voting in the mayor election. BJP and AAP took part in voting. Out of 28 total votes, BJP candidate got 14 votes and AAP candidate Anju Katyal got 13 votes. One vote of AAP party was declared invalid. BJP's Sarabjit Kaur was elected as new mayor of Chandigarh. There was ruckus in the council, AAP councilors protested against the nullification of one AAP vote and claimed that BJP was favoured in the counting process.
AAP called the mayor election "shocking death of democracy", and accused the District Collector of illegally electing the mayor Candidate from BJP despite AAP winning more seats in the council.

Challenge in High court
AAP challenged the results of the mayor election in the Punjab and Haryana High Court. In their petition AAP sought quashing of the 8 January polls and re-election of mayor.

According to the mayoral election norms, only a nominated councillor can become the presiding officer overseeing the polling for the mayor. The plea alleged that the process to select this nominated councillor was delayed and BJP’s Maheshinder Singh Sidhu was chosen as the presiding officer.

During the mayoral polls, a torn vote in support of BJP was accepted as valid, but another vote that had a tick mark in favour of AAP Candidate was declated invalid and not counted. AAP had questioned this in their petition to High Court.

References

External links
 Results declared by the State Election Commission
https://chandigarh.gov.in/sites/default/files/GEMCC-2021/result.pdf

Chandigarh
Elections in Chandigarh
2020s in Chandigarh
2021 elections in India